Seychelles competed at the 1992 Summer Olympics in Barcelona, Spain.
The nation returned to the Olympic Games after missing the 1988 Summer Olympics.

Competitors
The following is the list of number of competitors in the Games.

Athletics

Four athletes represented Seychelles in 1992.

Men
Track & road events

Field events

Boxing

Two boxers represented Seychelles in 1992.
Men

Sailing

One sailor represented Seychelles in 1992.

Men

Swimming

Four swimmers represented Seychelles in 1992.

Men

Women

References

Sources
Official Olympic Reports

Nations at the 1992 Summer Olympics
1992
1992 in Seychelles